Shoal Creek Township is one of nine townships in Bond County, Illinois, USA.  As of the 2020 census, its population was 1,610 and it contained 741 housing units.

Geography

Cities
 Donnellson (southwest quarter)
 Panama (south half)
 Sorento

Unincorporated towns
 Bunje
 Gilmore
 Reno

Cemeteries
The township contains these seven cemeteries: Bethel, Coyle, Peterson, Sunny Side, Tisdale, Union and Wade.

Major highways
  Illinois State Route 127

Airports and landing strips
 Mueller Airport

Demographics
As of the 2020 census there were 1,610 people, 555 households, and 341 families residing in the township. The racial makeup of the township was 94.47% White, 0.25% African American, 0.25% Native American, 0.00% Asian, 0.00% Pacific Islander, 0.31% from other races, and 4.72% from two or more races. Hispanic or Latino of any race were 1.74% of the population.

There were 555 households, out of which 26.70% had children under the age of 18 living with them, 53.33% were married couples living together, 6.67% had a female householder with no spouse present, and 38.56% were non-families. 35.30% of all households were made up of individuals, and 16.40% had someone living alone who was 65 years of age or older. The average household size was 2.44 and the average family size was 3.18.

The township's age distribution consisted of 19.0% under the age of 18, 2.7% from 18 to 24, 22.8% from 25 to 44, 36.6% from 45 to 64, and 19.1% who were 65 years of age or older. The median age was 50.4 years. For every 100 females, there were 105.6 males. For every 100 females age 18 and over, there were 98.2 males.

The median income for a household in the township was $50,795, and the median income for a family was $68,828. Males had a median income of $51,579 versus $29,766 for females. The per capita income for the township was $25,485. About 4.1% of families and 10.1% of the population were below the poverty line, including 7.3% of those under age 18 and 13.6% of those age 65 or over.

School districts
 Bond County Community Unit School District 2
 Highland Community Unit School District 5
 Hillsboro Community Unit School District 3

Political districts
 Illinois' 19th congressional district
 State House District 102
 State Senate District 51

References
 
 United States Census Bureau 2007 TIGER/Line Shapefiles
 United States National Atlas

External links
 City-Data.com
 Illinois State Archives

Townships in Bond County, Illinois
1888 establishments in Illinois
Townships in Illinois